Thank You World is the tenth studio album by American country music group The Statler Brothers. It was released in 1974 via Mercury Records. The album peaked at number 36 on the Billboard Top Country Albums chart.

Track listing
Side 1
"Thank You World" (Don Reid, Lew DeWitt) – 3:07
"City Lights" (Bill Anderson) – 3:15
"Sweet Charlotte Anne" (D. Reid) – 2:25
"Left-Handed Woman" (D. Reid, Harold Reid) – 2:14
"The Blackwood Brothers by The Statler Brothers" (D. Reid) – 3:50
"Cowboy Buckaroo" (Mason Williams) – 3:19
Side 2
"She's Too Good" (D. Reid, H. Reid) – 2:10
"The Babtism of Jesse Taylor" (Dallas Frazier, Sanger D. Shafer) – 2:35
"Streets of Baltimore" (Tompall Glaser, Harlan Howard) – 3:20
"Margie's at the Lincoln Park Inn" (Tom T. Hall) – 2:51
"The Boy Inside of Me" (DeWitt) - 3:10

Chart performance

References

1974 albums
The Statler Brothers albums
Mercury Records albums
Albums produced by Jerry Kennedy